"When Two Worlds Drift Apart"  is a song by Cliff Richard from his album Every Face Tells a Story and the third single from the album. It was released as a single in 1977 reaching number 46 on the UK singles chart. In South Africa it reached number 19.

In 1992 Richard released a French adaption of the song titled "Remember" as a single in France. It was taken from his album My Kinda Life that was only released in France. The album was made up of re-recordings and remixes of a selection of his previously released material from 1976 to 1989.

Chart performance

References

Cliff Richard songs
1977 singles
1977 songs
EMI Records singles